Guitars is the 19th record album written and performed by British musician Mike Oldfield, released in 1999. The concept of the album was to only perform it using guitar-like instruments.

Background 
Oldfield plays all the music on the album, using only guitars of various types.  The most remarkable usage is that of his Roland MIDI-equipped guitars, which he uses to trigger drum samples and produce string-like sounds. "Four Winds" is a four-part work, whose sections are musical portraits of the four compass points (North, South, East and West).

The Live Then & Now 1999 tour was in promotion of this album and Tubular Bells III.

Track listing 

 "Muse" – 2:12
 "Cochise" – 5:15
 "Embers" – 3:51
 "Summit Day" – 3:46
 "Out of Sight" – 3:48
 "B. Blues" – 4:30
 "Four Winds" – 9:32
 "Enigmatism" – 3:32
 "Out of Mind" – 3:46
 "From the Ashes" – 2:28

Inner cover photo 
The liner notes has a photo of Oldfield surrounded by some of his guitars, which he used on the album.  From the classical (Spanish acoustic) guitar at the top (and slightly to the right) going clockwise, the guitars are as follows:
 José Ramírez Classical guitar
 Fender Stratocaster, salmon pink (1962)
 Martin O-45 Parlour Guitar
 PRS Custom 24 with Roland synth pickup
 Fender Stratocaster, sunburst (1972)
 PRS Custom 24
 José Ramirez Flamenco guitar
 Wal 4 string bass guitar
 PRS McCarty Thinline

Certifications and sales

References

External links 
 Mike Oldfield Discography - Guitars at Tubular.net

Mike Oldfield albums
1999 albums
Warner Music Group albums
Concept albums